Asia (Russian: А́зия) was a cruiser of the Imperial Russian Navy. The ship was originally the Philadelphia-built iron merchant steamship Columbus completed in 1874

The iron passenger-cargo steamship Columbus was built 1873/74 in Philadelphia by William Cramp & Sons as Yard No.184 for local shipowner William P Clyde & Co.

Columbus was bought by Russia in May 1878, one of three merchant ships purchased in the United States to be transformed into naval cruisers: State of California became Europa, Saratoga became Afrika, and Columbus became Asia. After initial conversion by her builders, Cramp, in Philadelphia, she was sailed to Russia by a Russian crew for further outfitting in Kronstadt during 1878 and 1879.

The cruiser saw initial duty in the Far East, but then returned to the Baltic. She was downgraded to Cruiser 2nd Class on 1 February 1892. The future Vice Admiral Karl Jessen was her commanding officer in 1895 and 1896.

In August 1911, now rather obsolete, Asia was transferred to the reserve fleet.  In October 1912 she was renamed Kaukas (Russian: "Кавказ").  Following the outbreak of the First World War, she was once again renamed Asia on 11 September 1914, assigned to the Baltic Fleet's transport squadron and used as a minelayer.

The ship was deactivated in May 1918 and scrapped in 1923.

References

External links
 http://www.neva.ru./EXPO96/arm/azia.html

Steamships of the United States
Passenger ships of the United States
Cruisers of the Imperial Russian Navy
Naval ships of Russia
World War I cruisers of Russia
Ships built by William Cramp & Sons
1873 ships